Abbasabad County is in Mazandaran province, Iran. The capital of the county is the city of Abbasabad. At the 2006 census, the region's population (as Abbasabad District of Tonekabon County) was 45,589 in 12,694 households. It was separated from Tonekabon County in 2009. The following census in 2011 counted 47,591 people in 14,568 households. At the 2016 census, the county's population was 52,832 in 17,345 households.

Administrative divisions

The population history and structural changes of Abbasabad County's administrative divisions over three consecutive censuses are shown in the following table. The latest census shows three districts, five rural districts, and three cities.

References

 

Counties of Mazandaran Province